Bukal may refer to:

 Bukal, Sulawesi, Indonesia; see Buol Regency
 Bukál, another name for fanfrnoch, a Czech percussion instrument
 Josip Bukal (1945-2016), Yugoslav and Bosnian footballer

See also